Sörnäisten rantatie (Swedish: Sörnäs strandväg) is a wide street in Sörnäinen, Helsinki, Finland. It leads from the Hakaniemi market square to Suvilahti near the Kalasatama metro station.

For the most part, Sörnäisten rantatie is a high-traffic road connecting Itäväylä to the city centre. It is also part of the European route E75. As well as Itäväylä, the street Hermannin rantatie also branches off from an intersection at the northern end of the street, going towards Lahdenväylä. The Hakaniemi bridge connects Sörnäisten rantatie to Pohjoisranta, leading to the Helsinki Market Square.

Nowadays Sörnäisten rantatie is the most important traffic connection between the eastern and northeastern radial entrance roads to Helsinki (Tuusulanväylä, Lahdenväylä, Itäväylä) connecting them to the city centre.

The westernmost part of Sörnäisten rantatie, near the Hakaniemi market square, has become a separate, low-traffic side street. According to a proposed city plan, this part of the street will be renamed "Miina Sillanpään katu" ("Miina Sillanpää Street") in the future. According to the plan, a short street named Merihaankatu will lead from the renovated Hakaniemi bridge to Sörnäisten rantatie.

History
Earlier, Sörnäisten rantatie was mostly an interior street in the industrial and harbour area, with a railway track branching off from the Sörnäinen harbour rail to the Hakaniemi market square running along it. It was started to expand to a larger traffic road in the early 1950s when the new Kulosaari bridge was being constructed. The Hakaniemi bridge was completed in 1961, connecting Sörnäisten rantatie to Pohjoisranta in Kruununhaka and onwards to the South Harbour. As traffic originally went via Hakaniemenranta to the Pitkäsilta bridge, the Hakaniemenranta street remains a four-lane street to this day, even though the traffic does not support this any more.

Sörnäisten rantatie connected the bridges and created a main route from Itäinen moottoritie (now known as Itäväylä) to the centre as the new East Helsinki spread to the former loosely populated areas. As traffic increased in the 1960s and 1970s the street was expanded bit by bit to six lanes wide.

The traffic on both Itäväylä and Sörnäisten rantatie decreased significantly when the Helsinki Metro was opened in 1982.

Vladimir Lenin lived at Sörnäisten rantatie 1 from August to September 1917 at the house of Helsinki militia chief Kustaa Rovio.

From 1995 to 1997 the international car racing contest Helsinki Thunder took place on a 3.3 km long track near Sörnäisten rantatie.

Tunnel plan
There are plans to ease the traffic to the north to Hermannin rantatie with a tunnel. The planned 1.6 km long Sörnäinen tunnel would reach from Vilhonvuorenkatu near Sörnäisten rantatie to Hermanni to the south of Haukilahdenkatu. There are also plans to connect the tunnel to the proposed Helsinki central tunnel, which could continue all the way to Länsiväylä.

References

External links

Streets in Helsinki
Sörnäinen